The music of Iraq or Iraqi music,, also known as the music of Mesopotamia, encompasses the music of a number of ethnic groups and musical genres. Ethnically, it includes Mesopotamian Arabic, Assyrian, Kurdish and the music of Turkmen, among others. Apart from the traditional music of these peoples, Iraqi music includes contemporary music styles such as pop, rock, soul and urban contemporary. 

Iraq is recognized mainly for three instruments, the Oud, Iraqi Santur and Joza. The country' oud playing tradition have become an own school and a reference. It is illustrated specially by the figure of the acclaimed Munir Bashir. Other renowned Oudists are Naseer Shamma, Omar Bashir, Jamil Bachir, Ahmed Mukhtar, Rahim AlHaj, and Sahar Taha.

History

Instruments 
In 1929, archaeologists led by the British archaeologist Leonard Woolley, representing a joint expedition of the British Museum and the University of Pennsylvania Museum of Archaeology and Anthropology, discovered the Lyres of Ur or Harps of Ur, which are considered to be the world's second oldest surviving stringed instruments when excavating the Royal Cemetery of Ur between from 1922 and 1934. They discovered pieces of three lyres and one harp in Ur, located in what was Ancient Mesopotamia, modern day Iraq. They are over 4,500 years old, from ancient Mesopotamia during the Early Dynastic III Period (2550–2450 BC). The decorations on the lyres are fine examples of the court art of Mesopotamia of the period.

Classical Iraqi music

Iraqi classical music necessitates some discussion of the social environment, as well as references to the poetry. Poetry is always rendered clearly. Poetry is the art of the Iraqis, and sung poetry is the finest of all. In Baghdad from 760 to 1260, writers spurned musical notation. The music is melodically modal, and moves in a stepwise motion with repeated notes. Use of the lower end of a melodic range is characteristic, as is the use of silence; one listens through the silence. Following a cadence, the singer moves up to the next range of pitches. An arch shape is discernible, and the work ends in the original mode.

Singers of the Baghdad Court were praised for their excellence in composition, their knowledge of history and songs, and their ornaments and innovations. There was support for female singers and orators, such as Arib, a skilled poet, calligrapher, lutenist, composer, and backgammon player who wrote more than one thousand songs. The common instrument (comparable in popularity to the piano or violin in the west) is the oud. Classical Iraqi music is identifiable by the genre/canon, and by how it is performed.

Historically, music would have been played for gatherings of men. With the advent of the sound recording industry, things have changed somewhat. Today one invites musicians to perform at weddings; by the first quarter of the century, concerts were being staged at concert venues.

Maqam

Across the Arab world,  refers to specific melodic modes. When a musician performs  performances, the performer improvises, based on rules. There are between fifty and seventy , each with its own mood and characteristics, and many of which have sub-styles. Other characteristics of Iraqi music include a slow tempo, rhythmically free ornamentation or melodic lines, and predominantly minor modes.

Maqama texts are often derived from classical Arabic poetry, such as by Muhammad Mahdi al-Jawahiri, al-Mutanabbi and Abu Nuwas, or Persian poets like Hafez and Omar Khayyám.  Some performers used traditional sources translated into the dialect of Baghdad, and still others use Arabic, Turkish, Armenian, Hebrew, Turkmen, Aramaic or Persian language lyrics.

History

The roots of modern Iraqi maqam can be traced as far back as the Abbasid Caliphate, when that large empire was controlled from Baghdad.

The pesteh, a kind of light song which concludes a maqam performance, has been popularized in the later 20th century, growing more prominent along with the rise of recorded music and broadcast radio.  Among the most popular pesteh performers are the husband and wife Salima Pasha and Nazem Al-Ghazali.

The most popular modern singers of maqam are Rachid Al-Qundarchi (1887–1945), Youssouf Omar (1918–1987), Nazem Al-Ghazali (1920–1963), Salim Shibbeth (born 1908), Hassan Chewke (1912–1962), Najim Al-Sheikhli (1893–1938), Mohammed Al-Qubanchi (1900–1989), Hamid Al Saadi (1959-)  and Farida Mohammad Ali (1963- ).

Modern era

In 1936, Iraq Radio was established by two of Iraq's most prominent performers and composers, the Kuwaiti-born Iraqi musicians, Saleh and Daoud al-Kuwaity with an ensemble, with the exception of the percussion player.  The nightclubs of Baghdad also featured almost entirely Jewish musicians.  At these nightclubs, ensembles consisted of oud, qanun and two percussionists while the same format with ney and cello were used on the radio.

One of the reasons for the predominance of Jewish instrumentalists in early 20th century Iraqi music was a prominent school for blind Jewish children, which was founded in the late 1920s by the great qanunji ("qanun player") Joseph Hawthorne (Yusef Za'arur).

The most famous singer of the 1930s–1940s was perhaps Salima Pasha. The respect and adoration for Pasha were unusual at the time, since public performance by women was considered shameful and most female singers were recruited from brothels.

Numerous instrumentalists and singers of the middle and late twentieth century were trained at the Baghdad Conservatory.

In recent years the Iraqi school of oud players has become very prominent, with players such as Salman Shukur and Munir Bashir developing a very refined and delicate style of playing combining older Arabic elements with more recent Anatolian influences.

Pop music

Until the fall of Saddam Hussein, the most popular radio station was the Voice of Youth, which used to play the popular music of Iraq to continue the culture of the country. The station also played a mix of rock, hip hop and pop music, all of which had to be imported via Jordan due to international economic sanctions. Irish bands  The Corrs and Westlife were especially popular. Iraq also produced a major pan-Arab pop star in exile in Kadim Al Sahir, whose songs include Ladghat-e Hayya, which was banned by Hussein for its racy lyrical content.

Other modern Iraqi singers include Ali Al Essawi, whose song Makhtuba became huge hit in the Arab world and made him famous throughout the region. Major artists include Shatha Hassoun, Rahma Mezher, Majid al-Muhandis, Hussam Al-Rassam, Rida Al Abdullah and Iraq's very own boy band Unknown to No One, as well as Acrassicauda, Iraq's first heavy metal band. There are also ethnic Assyrian singers such as Klodia Hanna, Ashur Bet Sargis and Linda George  as well as a number of Kurdish, Turkmen, Yazidi, Dom and Armenian musicians such as Seta Hagopian.

Effect of 2003 Iraq War
After the 2003 invasion of Iraq and fall of Saddam Hussein, and with some religious figures coming to power, concerts were forbidden in areas considered as "conservative". However, since 2018, many concert were held in different areas throughout the country. In 2021, Babylon arts festival was held for the first time in almost 20 years. Performers were from Iraq, Middle East, Europe and Africa.

Important musicians 

 List of Iraqi musicians

References

Further reading 
Badley, Bill and Zein al Jundi. "Europe Meets Asia". 2000.  In Broughton, Simon and Ellingham, Mark  with McConnachie, James and Duane, Orla (Ed.), World Music, Vol. 1: Africa, Europe and the Middle East, pp 391–395. Rough Guides Ltd, Penguin Books.

External links
 BBC Radio 3 Audio (60 minutes): Iraq's classical and gypsy music traditions. Accessed November 25, 2010.
 BBC Radio 3 Audio (60 minutes): Ilham Al-Madfai. Accessed November 25, 2010.
 Iraq4u Music
 Sephardic Pizmonim Project by Jewish community of the Middle East.

 
Arts in Iraq